Bowdon High School is a public high school, part of the Carroll County School System, located in Bowdon, Georgia, United States. The school's mascot is the Red Devil.

Notable alumni

Nick Jones - NFL player and coach
C.J. Brewer - NFL player
Mike Dugan - American Politician

References

Public high schools in Georgia (U.S. state)
Schools in Carroll County, Georgia
1854 establishments in Georgia (U.S. state)
Educational institutions established in 1854